NAEA Propertymark (formerly National Association of Estate Agents or NAEA) is a membership organisation for estate agents (called real estate brokers in the US). It is based in and covers the UK. It is the UK's leading professional body for estate agents. Its members practice across all aspects of property in the UK, including residential and commercial sales and letting, property management, business transfer, auctioneering and land.

Founded in 1962 by estate agent and entrepreneur Raymond Andrews, the NAEA was established with the goal of upholding good practice and high professional standards in UK estate agency. This struck a chord with the industry at a time when there was little representation for estate agents and has allowed the Association to grow phenomenally over the years.

Propertymark 
Propertymark launched in February 2017 combining Association of Residential Letting Agents (ARLA), National Association of Estate Agents (NAEA), National Association of Valuers and Auctioneers (NAVA), Institution of Commercial and Business Agents (ICBA), Association of Professional Inventory Providers (APIP) and NFoPP Awarding Body into a single brand in order to achieve a greater consumer awareness.

Membership 
NAEA Propertymark offers consumer protection through it NAEA Propertymark Protected agents. NAEA Propertymark's aims are that it shall:

 Promote unity and understanding among estate agents and protect the general public against fraud, misrepresentation and malpractice
 Safeguard its membership and the public against restrictive practices within the profession
 Encourage a high ethical standard of competitive practice combined with commercial experience
 Provide an organisation for land and estate agents and managers, surveyors, auctioneers and valuers for the protection of their collective interest
 Do such things as may be necessary or expedient to sustain or raise the status of land and estate agents and managers, surveyors, auctioneers and valuers, and particularly members of the association as such.

NAEA Propertymark's rules were adopted at the inaugural meeting of the association on 6 March 1962 and have subsequently been amended, most recently in 2019.

Propertylive 
In October 2008 NAEA Propertymark entered the UK property portal market by launching their own property listings website PropertyLive. However in January 2013, it was announced that PropertyLive was to close.

See also
Estate agent
List of real estate topics

References

External links
 
Propertymark website

Property services companies of the United Kingdom
Real estate industry trade groups
Real estate in the United Kingdom
Housing in the United Kingdom
1962 establishments in the United Kingdom
Sales occupations
Organizations established in 1962
Trade associations based in the United Kingdom